Kartalkaya is a ski resort located in the Köroğlu Mountains, in Bolu Province, Turkey.

Description
Kartalkaya has suitable conditions for alpine skiing, ski touring and cross country skiing. It's much quieter and cheaper during the week because of weekend coaches from Istanbul and Ankara.

The duration of the skiing season is 120 days a year, between December 20 and March 20.

The nearest city is Bolu, 54 km (33 mi) away. Kartalkaya is located 2.5 hours away from the Esenboğa International Airport, in Ankara, and 3.5 hours away from the Istanbul Airport or Sabiha Gökçen International Airport, in Istanbul, by bus.

Hotels
Kartalkaya has 5 main hotels, two of which have their own snow resort.

Kartal Hotel
Grand Kartal Hotel
DorukKaya Ski & Mountain Resort
Kaya Palazzo Ski & Mountain Resort
Golden Key Kartalkaya

Sources
 Kartalkaya Weather Forecast, Snow Report and Resort Information, Snow-forecast.com
 Wintersports resort in Turkey, skiing, snowboard and more..., Guide to Turkey.com

External links
 Slope & Lift Informations of Kartalkaya
 CAFE SOCIETY Kartalkaya 
 Kartalkaya Golden Key Chalet Official Web Site - Kartalkaya Mountain Accommodation Info
 Region info website

Ski areas and resorts in Turkey
Buildings and structures in Bolu Province
Tourist attractions in Bolu Province